Campuzan is a commune in the Hautes-Pyrénées department in south-western France.

The area is known for its mountainous agricultural landscape of villages, farms, fields, upland pastures and winding mountain roads.

Before the French Revolution, this town was one of many within the former province of Gascony before the region was renamed and re-bordered as the Occitanie region of France.

See also
Communes of the Hautes-Pyrénées department

References

Communes of Hautes-Pyrénées